Irini Ioannidou is a German football midfielder of Greek descent, currently playing for 1. FC Köln in the German Bundesliga.

As an Under-19 international she took part in the 2010 U-19 European Championship for Germany.

Titles
 1 UEFA Women's Cup (2009)
 2 German Cups (2009, 2010)

References

1991 births
Living people
German women's footballers
FCR 2001 Duisburg players
SGS Essen players
Footballers from Essen
German people of Greek descent
Women's association football midfielders